Sylvite, or sylvine, is potassium chloride (KCl) in natural mineral form. It forms crystals in the isometric system very similar to normal rock salt, halite (NaCl). The two are, in fact, isomorphous. Sylvite is colorless to white with shades of yellow and red due to inclusions. It has a Mohs hardness of 2.5 and a specific gravity of 1.99. It has a refractive index of 1.4903. Sylvite has a salty taste with a distinct bitterness.

Sylvite is one of the last evaporite minerals to precipitate out of solution. As such, it is only found in very dry saline areas. Its principal use is as a potassium fertilizer.

Sylvite is found in many evaporite deposits worldwide. Massive bedded deposits occur in New Mexico and western Texas, and in Utah in the US, but the largest world source is in Saskatchewan, Canada. The vast deposits in Saskatchewan, Canada were formed by the evaporation of a Devonian seaway. Sylvite is the official mineral of Saskatchewan.

Sylvite was first described in 1832 at Mount Vesuvius near Napoli in Italy and named for the Dutch chemist, François Sylvius de le Boe (1614–1672).

Sylvite, along with quartz, fluorite and halite, is used for spectroscopic prisms and lenses.

See also
Sylvinite

References

External links
Mineral Resources of Saskatchewan

Potassium minerals
Halide minerals
Cubic minerals
Minerals in space group 225
Evaporite
Potash
Rocksalt group